Han Ho-gang (ハン・ホガン, 한호강, born September 18, 1993) is a Japanese Korean football player. He plays for Suwon Samsung Bluewings.

Club statistics
Updated to 28 November 2022.

Honours
 Blaublitz Akita
 J3 League (2): 2017, 2020

References

External links
Profile at Montedio
Profile at Blaublitz Akita

1993 births
Living people
Association football people from Kyoto Prefecture
South Korean footballers
J2 League players
J3 League players
Montedio Yamagata players
Blaublitz Akita players
Association football defenders